Battam is a surname. Notable people with the surname include:

Larry Battam (1876–1938), American baseball player
Thomas Battam (1810–1864), English painter